Leland Watson McGaw (July 27, 1927 – March 26, 2017) was a Canadian politician. He served in the Legislative Assembly of New Brunswick from 1967 to 1987, as a Progressive Conservative member for the constituency of Charlotte West (Charlotte from 1967 to 1974).

References

Progressive Conservative Party of New Brunswick MLAs
1927 births
2017 deaths